Gavin MacLeod (born Allan George See; February 28, 1931 – May 29, 2021) was an American actor best known for his roles as news writer Murray Slaughter on The Mary Tyler Moore Show and ship's captain Merrill Stubing on ABC's The Love Boat.  After growing up Catholic, MacLeod became an evangelical Christian in 1984. His career, which spanned six decades, included work as a Christian television host, author, and guest on several talk, variety, and religious programs.

MacLeod's career began in films in 1957. In 1965, he starred in The Sword of Ali Baba. He went on to appear in A Man Called Gannon (1968), in The Thousand Plane Raid (1969), and in Kelly's Heroes (1970).

MacLeod also achieved continuing television success co-starring alongside Ernest Borgnine on McHale's Navy (1962–1964) as Joseph "Happy" Haines.

Early life
Born Allan George See in Mount Kisco, New York, he was the elder of two children. His mother, Margaret (née Shea) See (1906–2004), a middle school dropout, worked for Reader's Digest. His father, George See (1906–1945), an electrician, was part Chippewa (Ojibwe). His brother Ronald was three years his junior. He grew up in Pleasantville, New York, and studied acting at Ithaca College, from which he graduated in 1952 with a bachelor's degree in fine arts.

After serving in the United States Air Force, he moved to New York City and worked at Radio City Music Hall while looking for acting work. At about this time he changed his name, drawing "Gavin" from a physically disabled victim in a television drama, and "MacLeod" from his Ithaca drama coach, Beatrice MacLeod. MacLeod said in a 2013 interview with Parade about his stage name, he "felt as if my name was getting in the way of my success." Allan, he wrote, "just wasn't strong enough," and See was "too confusing."

Career
MacLeod made his television debut in 1957 on The Walter Winchell File at the age of 26. His first movie appearance was a small, uncredited role in The True Story of Lynn Stuart in 1958. Soon thereafter, he landed a credited role in I Want to Live!, a 1958 prison drama starring Susan Hayward. He was soon noticed by Blake Edwards, who in 1958 cast him in the pilot episode of his NBC series Peter Gunn, two guest roles on the Edwards CBS series Mr. Lucky in 1959, and as a nervous harried navy yeoman in Operation Petticoat, with Cary Grant and Tony Curtis. Operation Petticoat proved to be a breakout role for MacLeod, and he was soon cast in two other Edwards comedies, High Time, with Bing Crosby and The Party with Peter Sellers.

In December 1961, he landed a guest role on The Dick Van Dyke Show, which was his first time working with Mary Tyler Moore. MacLeod also had guest appearances on Perry Mason, The Andy Griffith Show, Ben Casey, The Big Valley, Hogan's Heroes, Ironside, and My Favorite Martian. He played the role of a drug pusher, "Big Chicken", in two episodes of the first season of Hawaii Five-O.

His first regular television role began in 1962 as Joseph "Happy" Haines on McHale's Navy; he left this role after two seasons to appear as Signalman 2nd Class Crosley in the film The Sand Pebbles with Steve McQueen.

MacLeod's breakout role as Murray Slaughter on CBS's The Mary Tyler Moore Show won him lasting fame and two Golden Globe Award nominations. His starring role as Captain Stubing on The Love Boat, his next television series, was broadcast in 90 countries worldwide, between 1977 and 1986, spanning nine seasons. His work on that show earned him three Golden Globe nominations. Co-starring with him was a familiar actor and best friend Bernie Kopell as Dr. Adam Bricker and Ted Lange as bartender Isaac Washington. Lange said in a 2017 interview with The Wiseguyz Show of MacLeod that "Oh yeah, sure, Gavin was wonderful. Gavin lives down here in Palm Springs and we're still tight, all of us, Gavin and Bernie and Jill; we still see each other. Fred (Grandy) lives in a different state, we're still close, we're still good friends."

MacLeod became the global ambassador for Princess Cruises in 1986. He played a role in ceremonies launching many of the line's new ships. In 1997, MacLeod joined the Love Boat cast on The Oprah Winfrey Show.

After The Love Boat, MacLeod toured with Michael Learned of The Waltons in Love Letters. He made several appearances in musicals such as Gigi and Copacabana between 1997 and 2003. In December 2008, he appeared with the Colorado Symphony in Denver.

MacLeod and his wife were hosts on the Trinity Broadcasting Network for 17 years, primarily hosting a show about marriage called Back on Course. MacLeod appeared in Rich Christiano's Time Changer, a movie about time travel and how the morals of society have moved away from the Bible. He also plays the lead role in Christiano's 2009 film The Secrets of Jonathan Sperry.

Later activity
In April 2010, the entire cast of The Love Boat attended the TV Land Awards with the exception of MacLeod, due to a back operation to repair a couple of injured discs. Former co-star and long-term friend Ted Lange contacted him and received word that MacLeod was doing well. In December, MacLeod appeared as a guest narrator with the Florida Orchestra and Master Chorale of Tampa Bay.

MacLeod served as the honorary Mayor of Pacific Palisades for five years, until Sugar Ray Leonard succeeded him in 2011. On February 28, 2011, MacLeod celebrated his 80th birthday aboard the Golden Princess on Princess Cruises in Los Angeles, California. His friends and family wished him a happy birthday and presented him with a  3-D cake replica of the Pacific Princess, the original "Love Boat".

MacLeod appeared on the special for Betty White's 90th birthday on January 17, 2012. He reunited with White to film "Safety Old School Style", an in-flight safety video for Air New Zealand in 2013. By January 2013, the video had been viewed two million times on YouTube. In October 2013, MacLeod appeared on Today to begin the promotional tour for his new book This Is Your Captain Speaking: My Fantastic Voyage Through Hollywood, Faith & Life. This appearance included a special set change to honor MacLeod's appearance on the show. In addition to television appearances, he continued his national book tour.

On November 5, 2013, MacLeod joined his Love Boat cast mates live on the CBS daytime show The Talk. A full one-hour episode was dedicated to the cast reunion. The Talk co-hosts dressed in costumes to commemorate their special guests' arrivals. Spanish-American actress Charo also appeared on the reunion show. Charo guest-starred in eight episodes of The Love Boat. Jack Jones performed the Love Boat theme song, which he introduced in 1977.

In December 2013, MacLeod appeared on The 700 Club to discuss his life and career.  The following year, on February 1, MacLeod was honored with a star on the Palm Springs Walk of Stars in downtown Palm Springs, California.  In January 2015, MacLeod appeared in the Rose Parade along with several other members of the original cast of The Love Boat.  Later that same year MacLeod starred in the play Happy Hour at the Coachella Valley Repertory Theatre (CVRep) in Rancho Mirage, California, a role which earned him critical praise.

Writing
In 1987, following MacLeod's conversion to evangelical Christianity and remarriage, he and his wife, Patti, wrote about his struggles with alcoholism and their divorce in Back On Course: The Remarkable Story of a Divorce That Ended in Remarriage.

In 2013, MacLeod released a memoir, This Is Your Captain Speaking: My Fantastic Voyage Through Hollywood, Faith & Life. He said, "...all my living has been based on what other people have written... I hope it can help others, how I overcame and never gave up. There are so many lessons in life." In the book, MacLeod recounted his stories as a young actor trying to make a name for himself in Hollywood, the lifelong friends he made, struggles with alcoholism, divorce, and faith.

Personal life
While working as an usher and elevator operator at Radio City Music Hall, MacLeod met dancer Joan F. Rootvik, who was a Rockette. They married in 1955 and had two sons and two daughters before divorcing in 1972.

In 1974, he married Patti Kendig. The couple divorced in 1982 and remarried in 1985. During the mid-1980s, they became evangelical Protestants and credited their faith for bringing them back together.

On September 20, 2009, MacLeod discussed his conversion to evangelicalism at The Rock Church in Anaheim, California, and was a guest speaker there in 2012.

Death
MacLeod died at his home in Palm Desert, California, on May 29, 2021, aged 90. He is interred at Forest Lawn Cemetery in Cathedral City.

Filmography

Film

Television

References

External links
 Official Goodreads Page
 
 
 
 TBN page
 Gavin MacLeod at Find a Grave

1931 births
2021 deaths
20th-century American male actors
20th-century evangelicals
21st-century American male actors
21st-century evangelicals
American evangelicals
American male film actors
American male television actors
American people of Ojibwe descent
Burials at Forest Lawn Cemetery (Cathedral City)
Converts to evangelical Christianity from Roman Catholicism
Ithaca College alumni
Male actors from New York City
Ojibwe people
People from Mount Kisco, New York
People from Pleasantville, New York
Television personalities from New York City
United States Air Force airmen